Peter of Alcántara (1499 – October 
18, 1562) was a Spanish Franciscan friar who was canonized in 1669.

Biography
He was born at Alcántara, Province of Cáceres, Extremadura, Spain. His father, Peter Garavita, was the governor of Alcántara, and his mother was of the noble family of Sanabia. He decided to join the Franciscans at the age of 16 shortly after he was sent to university in Salamanca by his stepfather.

Returning home, he became a Franciscan friar of the Stricter Observance in the friary at Manxaretes, Extremadura, in 1515. At the age of twenty-two he was sent to found a new community of the Stricter Observance at Badajoz. He was ordained a priest in 1524, and the following year was appointed Guardian of the friary of St. Mary of the Angels at Robredillo, Old Castile. A few years later he began preaching with much success. He preferred to preach to the poor; his sermons, taken largely from the Prophets and Sapiential Books, breathe the tenderest human sympathy. At the time Peter entered the Order, the reform of the "Discalced Friars" consisted of the Custody of the friaries in Spain and Santa Maria Pietatis in Portugal, all subject to the Minister General of the Observants.

In 1538 Peter was made minister provincial of the Franciscan province of St Gabriel of Estremadura but resigned when his plans to enforce severe rules among the friars were opposed, and he retired with John of Avila into the mountains of Arrábida in Portugal, where he joined Friar Martim de Santa Maria in a life of eremitical solitude. Soon, though, other friars came to join him, and several little communities were established. Peter was chosen guardian and Master of novices at the friary of Palhais, Barreiro. In 1560 these communities were erected into the Province of Arrábida.

Returning to Spain in 1553 he spent two more years in solitude; then he journeyed barefoot to Rome and obtained permission of Julius III to found some poor friaries in Spain under the jurisdiction of the Minister General of the Conventuals. Friaries were established at Pedrosa, Plasencia and elsewhere; in 1556 they were made a commissariat, with Peter as Commissary, and in 1561 a religious Province under the title of St Joseph. Not discouraged by the opposition and ill-success his efforts at reform had met with in St Gabriel Province, Peter drew up the constitutions of the new province with even greater severity. The reform spread rapidly into other provinces of Spain and Portugal.

In 1562 the Province of St Joseph was put under the jurisdiction of the Minister General of the Observants, and two new custodies were formed: St. John Baptist in Valencia and St. Simon in Galicia (see Friars Minor). Francis Borgia once wrote to him: "Your remarkable success is a special comfort to me."

In Teresa of Ávila, Peter perceived a soul chosen of God for a great work, and her success in the reform of Carmel (see Carmelites) was in great measure due to his counsel, encouragement and defense. It was a letter from Peter (dated April 14, 1562) that encouraged her to found her first monastery at Avila, August 24 of that year. Teresa's autobiography is the source of much of our information regarding Peter's life, work, the gift of miracles and prophecy. According to Teresa of Ávila, it was a very common thing for him to take food only once in three days, and that sometimes he would go a week without eating.

He was a man of remarkable austerity and poverty who travelled throughout Spain preaching the Gospel to the poor. He wrote a Treatise on Prayer and Meditation, which was considered a masterpiece by Teresa, Francis de Sales and Louis of Granada.

While in prayer and contemplation, he was often seen in ecstasies and levitation. In his deathbed, he was offered a glass of water which he refused, saying that "Even my Lord Jesus Christ thirsted on the Cross..." He died while on his knees in prayer on October 18, 1562 in a monastery at Arenas (now Arenas de San Pedro, Province of Ávila, Old Castile).

Veneration
It is also said that Peter slept very little and that he always slept sitting up. Because he was awake most of the time when his brother friars were sleeping, he is the patron saint of night watchmen.

Legacy

Peter of Alcantara was beatified in Rome by Pope Gregory XV on April 18, 1622, and canonized by Pope Clement IX on April 28, 1669. 
 
In 1670, Peter of Alcantara's feast day was set as October 19, the day after his death, because in the General Roman Calendar October 18 was the feast of Saint Luke the Evangelist. The 1969 revision of that calendar omitted his name because of what it saw as the limited importance of the feast on a worldwide level, while at the same time it expressly envisaged its inclusion in local calendars. His feast could thus be moved to his day of death, October 18, which is now its official date. Some Traditionalist Catholics continue to observe versions of the General Roman Calendar of the 1670-1969 period, of which the 1960 version is incorporated into the 1962 Roman Missal that Pope Benedict XVI permitted to be used by all Latin Church priests for Masses without the people and, under the conditions indicated in article 5 of his motu proprio Summorum Pontificum, in Masses with the people.

Peter of Alcantara is the patron saint of nocturnal adoration of the Blessed Sacrament. In 1826, he was named patron saint of Brazil, and in 1962 (the fourth centenary of his death), of the Spanish region of Extremadura. He is also venerated as patron saint of various parishes in the United States and the Philippines. The town of San Pedro de Alcántara in the province of Málaga is named after him.

See also

Diocese of Shrewsbury Cathedral of Our Lady Help of Christians and St. Peter of Alcantara, United Kingdom
St. Peter of Alcantara Cathedral, Brazil
Saint Peter of Alcantara Parish Church, Pakil, Laguna, Philippines

References

External links

Image of Peter
Founder Statue in St Peter's Basilica
Santi e Beati: San Pietro d'Alcantara 
Tradition in Action – Saint of the Day: St Peter of Alcantara
Foley O.F.M., Leonard. "St. Peter of Alcantara (1499–1562)", Saint of the Day, Franciscan Media
St. Peter of Alcantara, Treatise on Prayer and Meditation

1499 births
1562 deaths
16th-century Christian mystics
People from the Province of Cáceres
Spanish Friars Minor
Franciscan saints
Spanish Roman Catholic saints
Carmelite spirituality
University of Salamanca alumni
16th-century Christian saints
Roman Catholic mystics
Franciscan mystics
Canonizations by Pope Clement IX